Leis 26 Pontevedra Fútbol Sala is a futsal club based in Pontevedra, city of the province of Pontevedra in the autonomous community of Galicia.

The club was founded in 1980 and her arena is Pavillón Municipal with capacity of 4,500 seaters.

The club has the sponsorship of Pescamar and Diario de Pontevedra.

Season to season

1 season in Primera División
5 seasons in Segunda División
14 seasons in Segunda División B
2 season in Tercera División

External links
Official website

Futsal clubs in Galicia (Spain)
Futsal clubs established in 1980
1980 establishments in Spain
Pontevedra